Marcus Richard Kimball, Baron Kimball (18 October 1928 – 26 March 2014) was a British Conservative politician.

Early life
The son of Major Lawrence Kimball, he was born in Marylebone, London, and educated at Eton College and Trinity College, Cambridge. He became a farmer and a Lloyd's underwriter. He was a councillor on Rutland County Council and commanded a squadron of the Leicestershire Yeomanry.

Political career
Kimball contested Derby South in 1955.

He was the Member of Parliament (MP) for Gainsborough from a 1956 by-election until 1983. While representing this constituency, he wrote to Prime Minister Margaret Thatcher, after Argentina's invasion of the Falkland Islands, that he felt the British government should "let the Argentinians have the Falklands with as little fuss as possible". This letter, apparently written without the knowledge of his constituency party, remained secret until revealed by the release of part of the Thatcher archive in 2013.

According to his obituary he treated his constituents in much the same way as he treated the tenants of his Market Harborough and Altnaharra estates advising potential MPs not to promise to hold surgeries and not to live in the constituency unless sure there was a good local hunt.

Kimball opposed separate taxation for women in 1978, saying women just gave the bill to their husbands.

Knighted in 1981, Kimball was subsequently given a life peerage as Baron Kimball, of Easton in the County of Leicestershire on 9 May 1985.

Hunting interests
A keen huntsman, Kimball was joint master of the Fitzwilliam Hunt 1952 and 1953, and the Cottesmore Hunt 1953–58. He was chairman of the British Field Sports Society 1966–82, and its President 1996–98. He was vice-president of its successor organisation, the Countryside Alliance from 1998. He indirectly gave money to an anti-field sports organisation after an Industrial Tribunal ruled that he sacked his housekeeper unfairly and she donated part of her compensation.

Other interests
In March 1993, he was appointed Chairman of the British Greyhound Racing Trust, a position he held until 1996. He also held senior positions in show jumping, light horse breeding organisations and in the Royal College of Veterinary Surgeons.

He died at the age of 85 on 26 March 2014.

Arms

References 

Times Guide to the House of Commons, 1966 & 1979

External links 

1928 births
2014 deaths
Conservative Party (UK) MPs for English constituencies
Kimball, Marcus Kimball, Baron
Knights Bachelor
People educated at Eton College
Councillors in Rutland
British hunters
Alumni of Trinity College, Cambridge
People from Marylebone
Leicestershire Yeomanry officers
Masters of foxhounds in England
Politicians awarded knighthoods
People from Great Easton, Leicestershire
People in greyhound racing
UK MPs 1955–1959
UK MPs 1959–1964
UK MPs 1964–1966
UK MPs 1966–1970
UK MPs 1970–1974
UK MPs 1974
UK MPs 1974–1979
UK MPs 1979–1983
Life peers created by Elizabeth II